The 2014 Sacramento State Hornets football team represented California State University, Sacramento as a member of the Big Sky Conference during the 2014 NCAA Division I FCS football season. Led by first-year head coach Jody Sears, Sacramento State compiled an overall record of 7–5 with a mark of 4–4 in conference play, placing seventh in the Big Sky. The Hornets played home games at Hornet Stadium in Sacramento, California.

Schedule

Despite Weber State also being a member of the Big Sky Conference, the September 13 game against Sacramento State was considered a non-conference game

References

Sacramento State
Sacramento State Hornets football seasons
Sacramento State Hornets football